The third USS Preble was a  in the United States Navy. She was named for Commodore Edward Preble.

Construction
Preble was laid down by the Union Iron Works, San Francisco, California, on 21 April 1899; launched on 2 March 1901; sponsored by Miss Ethel Preble; and commissioned on 14 December  1903.

Pre-World War I
Preble, assigned to the Pacific Fleet, operated with the 4th and 2nd Torpedo Flotillas off the western seaboard from Washington to the Panama Canal Zone until 1908, making a cruise to Hawaii and Samoa (24 August-November 1908). On returning she resumed west coast operations, continuing them until 4 February 1909, when she arrived at Mare Island for inactivation. In reserve from 23 February-17 September, she was then reassigned to the Pacific Torpedo Flotilla, and until 1913 operated with Torpedo Flotilla, Pacific Fleet. Placed in reserve again on 19 June 1913, she remained at Mare Island until resuming operations with the torpedo flotilla on 23 April 1914. Preble observed the Topolobampo naval campaign in the Gulf of California, she was present at the Fourth Battle of Topolobampo, the final naval action of the campaign.

World War I
Torpedo practice, gunnery exercises and minesweeping operations followed, and during the summer of 1915, Preble participated in a cruise to Alaskan waters to gather logistic information. After another period in reserve status (25 October 1916-3 April 1917), Preble departed San Diego, California on 30 April 1917, for the east coast. She arrived at Norfolk, Virginia on 13 July, and until the end of World War I was engaged in coastwise convoy duty along the mid-Atlantic seaboard. Remaining on the east coast after the war, she decommissioned at New York, on 11 July 1919. Her name was struck from the Navy List on 15 September 1919 and she was sold, on 3 January 1920, to Henry A. Hitner's Sons Company of Philadelphia, Pennsylvania.

Noteworthy commanding officer
 Lieutenant Harry Adrian McClure (3 May 1916-November 1916) (Later Commodore)

Notes

External links
Photos of USS Preble

 

Bainbridge-class destroyers
World War I destroyers of the United States
Ships built in San Francisco
1901 ships
Ships built by Union Iron Works